Cleverman is an Australian television drama program based on an original concept by Ryan Griffen. The series premiered on 1 June 2016 on SundanceTV in the United States and 2 June (other side of International Date Line) on ABC in Australia.

The six-part drama series reimagines several stories of the Aboriginal Dreamtime in a modern, superheroic context, and reflects on racism, asylum seekers and border protection. Its central story revolves around two estranged Gumbaynggirr brothers who are forced together to fight for their own survival when one of them is passed the mantle of the "Cleverman". Creatures from the Dreaming also feature in the series' real world dystopian landscape.

The series was renewed for a second season on 2 June 2016, set six months later, having received 450,000 in funding from Screen NSW. The second season aired another 6 episodes in 2017, concluding the series with a total of 12 episodes.

Cleverman
The Cleverman is an important figure in many Australian Aboriginal cultures. Series creator Ryan Griffen describes the Cleverman as "like the Pope of the Dreamtime ... the conduit between the present and the Dreaming". The version in the television series combines many Cleverman traditions from different Aboriginal clans to create a superheroic version, with powers relating to the Dreaming's connection to past, present and future. Koen West, the protagonist of the series displays his powers through both seasons either from instinct or learned by experience. He can heal instantly, and can not die by conventional methods, but can be hurt or killed either by a being from the spiritual plane such as the Namorrodor, or the tree sap his brother Waruu used from their childhood tree that he forged into a dagger. Koen can receive visions from touching others seeing future events, and he can shape shift into a bird when escaping or needing to sneak into a building. He also has access to a spiritual energy shot dubbed the ‘Blue Blast’, a ball of energy fired from his chest that when it hits its target it separates them from their soul thus when they die they fade to nothingness. Koen can swallow the soul if he chooses to erase it from existence or return it to its body by killing the host and resurrecting them. As Cleverman, Koen uses the Nulla Nulla, a traditional Aboriginal War Club also used by the Hairies.

Hairypeople
The Hairypeople or "Hairies" are designed by Jacob ("Jake") Nash, production designer for the Australian Aboriginal Bangarra Dance Theatre, and realised by the Weta Workshop, known for their work on The Lord of The Rings and other fantasy and science fiction films. The Hairypeople in Cleverman are inspired by Australian Aboriginal mythology of hairymen drawn from multiple Aboriginal peoples, including the Gamilaraay and Bundjalung people of northern New South Wales. In the series, they speak Kumbainggar, another language from northern New South Wales.

In the world of Cleverman, Hairies are stronger and hardier than humans, covered in thick facial and body hair, and have tough, sharp fingernails.  They also have much longer lifespans. They share some things with Aboriginal Australians, including a knowledge of land, culture and the Dreaming. Their DNA differs enough from humans to be considered a different species. They come to the notice of modern human society six months prior to the beginning of the series, in an event known as "Emergence Day". Those who choose to live their lives as they always have—covered in a coat of hair and speaking their traditional languages—are confined to "The Zone" by a fearful government. To escape, some Hairies become "shavers", learning to speak English and removing their body hair in order to blend in with human society.

Cast

Regulars
 Hunter Page-Lochard as Koen West, Waruu's half-brother, an outcast who lives with his friends Blair and Ash. To fund their pub, 'The Couch', he smuggles Hairies for money then turns them over to the CA for the reward. This results in the death of young Hairy girl Jyra, causing him self-doubt. After the passing of his Uncle Jimmy, Koen inherits the powers of the Cleverman along with the Nulla Nulla. He has a toxic relationship with his half brother Waruu, which grows worse with jealousy and hatred as Waruu always wanted to be Cleverman. Over the course of the series he begins to gradually accept his role as Cleverman, finding redemption in his previous actions and facing up to Waruu. Koen returns to the Zone and kills the Namorrodor; a demon who killed Jimmy and others, usurping Waruu as leader of the community. In Season 2 he’s visited by Jimmy’s spirit who teaches more about the role of Cleverman and how to control his abilities. He learns about his Aunt Linda’s part in his parents' deaths but forgives her and sets off to finally save his Hairy friends and fight Waruu. In the end both are critically wounded with Koen hitting Waruu with the Blue Blast and swallowing his soul as he passes on from the injuries he sustained from their fight.
 Rob Collins as Waruu West, Koen's older half brother, an activist for equal rights amongst humans and subhumans, who hoped to be chosen to be the next Cleverman. Married to Nerida and father of Alinta; having an affair with Belinda Frosche. He lives in the Zone with his family and is the leader of the community. He begins to become unhinged due to Koen becoming the new Cleverman and repeatedly tries to kill him. After he loses respect from the Zone and his family due to his adultery and increasingly violent nature he becomes ruthless in his quest to change the fates of Hairies and kill Koen. He, along with Slade, creates a serum that turns Hairies into humans to continue his cohesion plan but is undermined by Koen’s attempts to stop him. He gradually starts turning into a Hairy due to Slade’s experiments and finds a way to finally kill his brother using tree sap he forged into a knife. He loses to Koen in the end when after stabbing him in the stomach In their final battle he’s hit with the Blue Blast losing his soul and eventually dying into nothingness. 
 Deborah Mailman as Aunty Linda, estranged mother of Waruu and adoptive mother of Koen; dying of cancer and is knowledgeable of the Dreaming and history of Cleverman. She helps Koen with the Hairies who escaped from the Zone and her secret of killing Koen’s parents are revealed. She is forgiven by Koen who returns her soul to her when she was caught in his Blue Blast.  
 Iain Glen as Jarrod Slade, married to Charlotte and an enterprising man whose agenda involves the Hairypeople and Koen. He had a partnership with Uncle Jimmy in order to obtain his secrets. He creates two formulas, one which can grant people the abilities of Hairies with side effects of becoming one or passing it on to their offspring like he did his, and another that turns Hairies human. He eventually dies when his madness from his experiments make him try to forcefully abort his wife's unborn child ending in her stabbing him in the neck with a scalpel with the last image of him being locked in darkness as he was hit with Blue Blast. 
 Frances O'Connor as Dr. Charlotte Cleary, married to Slade, yet is unsuspecting of his agenda. A humanitarian, she runs a free clinic in the Zone. She cares greatly for the Hairies and hates the prejudice and mistreatment done to them. She becomes pregnant unaware Slade had inadvertently made it into a Hairy due to his experiments. She's captured by Jarli who takes her to his tribe to protect the child as he cares for its safety. She returns to stop Slade but kills him in self defense when he tries to abort the baby. 
 Ryan Corr as Blair Finch, Koen's childhood friend and the boyfriend of Ash.
 Tasma Walton as Araluen, a Hairy woman, caring wife of Boondee and mother of Djukara, Latani and Jyra. Was captured and forced to work in Frankie's brothel, servicing Geoff Matthews. 
 Tony Briggs as Boondee, a Hairy man, protective husband of Araluen and father to Djukara, Latani and Jyra. Still held in containment.
 Stef Dawson as Ash Kerry, Blair's girlfriend who is in a complex relationship with Koen.
 Jada Alberts as Nerida West, Waruu's wife and Alinta's mother. Has a strong relationship with Linda and knows of her husband's adultery. Lives in the Zone.
 Tamala Shelton as Alinta West, Waruu and Nerida's daughter. An ally to the Hairypeople and resentful of the adulterous relationships of both her father and mother. Lives in the Zone.
 Rarriwuy Hick as Latani, a young Hairy woman, daughter of Araluen and Boondee, sister to Djukara and Jyra. The only member of her family to avoid capture, she makes her way to the Zone and befriends Alinta.
 Tysan Towney as Djukara, a young Hairy man, son of Araluen and Boondee, brother to Latani and Jyra. He is very hot-tempered, vengeful and easily influenced. Waruu and Harry free him from a CA containment centre and take him to the Zone with Mungo and Kulya.
 Andrew McFarlane as Geoff Matthews, the Minister for Immigration and Border Protection, who is against the Hairypeople, though his true agenda is to redevelop the Zone. He is a client of Frankie's who is regularly serviced by Araluen.
 Marcus Graham as Steve McIntyre, who directs the Containment Authority (CA), a private security outfit operating under the authority of Matthews but in the employ of Slade.
Rachael Blake as Marion Frith, a politician who replaces Matthews, and attempts to bring the CA under tighter government control.
Clarence Ryan as Jarli, a Hairy warrior from the Bindawu tribe.  He is extremely antagonistic towards the humans, or "skins", and casually kills them when opportunities arise. He is unapologetic about Hairypeople who die as a result of his actions, impatient with his elders, and seeks to provoke a war.
Luke Ford as Tim Dolan, a former police officer who was forced into private-sector security work for the CA, but sympathizes with the Hairypeople.  He is often partnered with Hendricks.

Recurring Guests
 Alexis Lane as Kora, a Dreaming spirit who was summoned by Uncle Jimmy prior to his death; needs Koen to send her back to her dimension.
 Leeanna Walsman as Belinda Frosche, a Channel 8 reporter; has a sexual relationship with Waruu.
 Jack Charles as Uncle Jimmy West, the original Cleverman who chose Koen to succeed him over Waruu. Was in league with Jarrod Slade before he had himself killed by a Dreaming creature called "Namorrodor." He returns as a ghost to help train Koen.
 Adam Briggs as Maliyan, a violent-minded Hairy man who clashes with Waruu. A community leader in the Zone.
 Lynette Curran as Virgil, a reclusive yet inventive woman who aids Latani, making her human contact lenses.
 Robyn Nevin as Jane O'Grady, a talk-show host who discusses the Hairypeople with Waruu and Matthews. 
 Josh McConville as Dickson
 Mansoor Noor as McIntyre 2IC
 Rhondda Findleton as Frankie, a vicious brothel madam who purchases Araluen.
 Isaac Drandic	as Harry, a Hairy man and Waruu's right hand. Lives in the Zone.
 Katie Wall as Rowena, a drug addict working as Frankie's assistant.
 Miranda Tapsell as Lena, a Hairy woman who defeats several would be attackers on a bus. 
 Rahel Romahn as Ludo
 Sam Parsonson	as Taki
 Val Weldon as Jyra, a Hairy girl, daughter of Araluen and Boondee, sister to Djukara and Latani. She is killed following her family's capture; her spirit possesses another Hairy child until Koen releases her, earning her forgiveness.
 Aileen Huynh as Dr Everick, a scientist in Slade's employ, experimenting on Kora and Hairypeople.
 Nancy Denis as Eve, a nurse working with Charlotte.
 Trevor Jamieson as Uncle Max, an Aboriginal elder who runs a gym in the Zone. 
 Kamil Ellis as Mungo, a Hairy boy who escapes capture with Djukara and Kulya and hides in the Zone.
 Waverley Stanley Jr. as Kulya, a Hairy boy who escapes capture with Djukara and Mungo and hides in the Zone.
 Mark Winter as Bill Hendricks, Tim's partner in the CA, a sadist who preys on Hairypeople. He is responsible for Mungo's death and later torments Latani.
 Tessa Rose as Yani / Gwen, an older Hairy woman who had lost all her children and, tired of living in fear, volunteered for the Inclusion Initiative.  Happily reborn as Gwen, she does not want to leave her new home.
 Les Chantery as Deepak Malhotra
 Nicholas Hope as Dr. Mitchell
 Alan Dukes as Nurse Robert
 Israel Dedeigbo as Daku
 Anthony John Ah See as Gawu
 Alec Doomadgee as Darana
 Lasarus Ratuere as Bakanah
 Taylor Ferguson as Audie Martin, a young woman who becomes romantically interested in Koen.
 Megan Hind as Taylor Diaz
 Lisa Flanagan as Harah
 Sarah Armanious as Lucia
 Tasneem Roc as Sarah Gottlieb, a journalist
 David Barnett as Riwarri, a Hairy and companion of Jarli
 Megan O'Connell as Farugia, a CA officer

Broadcast
The series premiered on 1 June 2016 on SundanceTV in the United States and 2 June (other side of International Date Line) on ABC in Australia. Series 2 premiered on those same networks on 28 (29) June 2017.

In February 2018, Series 1 began broadcasting in Canada on both T+E and Aboriginal Peoples Television Network (aptn). In April 2018, aptn continued with Series 2.

Episodes

Series 1 (2016)

Series 2 (2017)

Critical reception
The show has been met with favourable reviews on review aggregator Rotten Tomatoes, where the first season was given a rating of 91% based on reviews from eight critics. The first series of Cleverman received generally favourable reviews on Metacritic scoring a rating of 61/100 based on reviews from seven critics.

A review from the Boston Herald stated, "Cleverman is unlike any other TV miniseries you've seen before. The gritty Australian production uses a sci-fi backdrop to test notions of racial identity and integration with a twist of supernatural terror", and went on to say "The first episode is confusing, introducing a multitude of characters and agendas. Stay with it. The second episode brings several of the characters and the conflicts into focus."

Mike Hale of The New York Times stated that "Cleverman has a rough immediacy in its pacing and cinematography that helps to make up for its deficiencies elsewhere, and if you have an appetite for sci-fi conspiracy thrillers, it's worth sampling." A review from The A.V. Club said "Cleverman is full of potential" but "is too busy building a world to tell a story."

Ratings
The American premiere on 1 June 2016 gained 197,000 viewers, and an 18–49 demo rating of 0.04, while the Australian premiere the following day was watched by 452,000 viewers.

References

External links
 Official ABC TV website
 Official Sundance TV website
 

2016 Australian television series debuts
2017 Australian television series endings
American fantasy television series
Australian science fiction television series
Australian Broadcasting Corporation original programming
Australian fantasy television series
Dystopian television series
English-language television shows
New Zealand fantasy television series
Racism in television
Apartheid in fiction
Indigenous Australian television series
American fantasy drama television series
Television series based on mythology